Venta Silurum was a town in the Roman province of Britannia or Britain. Today it consists of remains in the village of Caerwent in Monmouthshire, south east Wales. Much of it has been archaeologically excavated and is on display to the public.

History

Foundation
Venta was established by the Romans in around AD 75 as an administrative centre for the defeated Silures tribe in Roman Wales. Venta Silurum seems to mean "Market town of the Silures" (cf. Venta Belgarum and Venta Icenorum). This is confirmed by inscriptions on the "Civitas Silurum" stone, now on display in the parish church. The town, which was located on the Roman road between Isca Augusta (Caerleon) and Glevum (Gloucester) and close to the Severn Estuary, was - in contrast with nearby "Isca" - essentially established for civilian administration rather than for military purposes.

Development
Initially Venta had a forum and basilica. By the early part of the 2nd century, during the reign of Hadrian, the civitas had begun construction work on a market place and developing centre of local government. Public baths and shops, including a blacksmiths, were built about the same time. Remains of farms and dwellings, some with courtyards, have also been excavated.

A Roman temple, perhaps dedicated to Mars and the Celtic god Ocelus, has been identified on the site. A bowl with a chi-rho symbol shows that early Christian worship had begun in the late 3rd century.

Post-Roman legacy 

Following the withdrawal of the Roman legions from Britain, the town remained occupied until at least the mid-5th century.  Early Christian worship was still established. The town might have had a bishop.  According to traditional accounts in the Vitae Sanctorum Britanniae, a monastery was founded by Saint Tatheus in about the 6th century. The site of the present church occupies part of an early Christian cemetery.

The name Venta gave its name to the emerging Kingdom of Gwent (called initially "Kingdom of Guenta"), and the town itself became known as Caer-went or "the castra/fort of Venta/Gwent". Tradition holds that Caradog Freichfras of Gwent moved his court from Caerwent to Portskewett around the 6th century.

Archaeology

The town lacked substantial defences until the mid 4th century when stone town walls were built. A small garrison may have been based in the town during this period. The walls have been described as "easily the most impressive town defence to survive from Roman Britain, and in its freedom from later rebuilding one of the most perfectly preserved in Northern Europe." In 1881 a portion of a highly intricate coloured floor mosaic or Tessellated pavement, depicting different types of fish, was unearthed during excavations in the garden of a cottage.

In 2008, a dig involving Wessex Archaeology and volunteers from the local Chepstow Archaeology Society, found a row of narrow shop buildings and a villa with painted walls, frescoes of Roman art and mosaic floors. Among the artefacts excavated were a bone penknife hilt depicting two gladiators fighting, coins, Roman glassware, ceramics, human and animal bones, lead patches used for repairing and pieces of mosaic.
These excavations featured in Channel 4's Time Team programme, broadcast on 25 January 2009.

Modern houses are built on top of half the site of the old Roman market place.  The ruins of several Roman buildings are still visible, including the foundations of a 4th-century temple. The fact that most of the houses lacked mosaic or hypocaust-heated floors, however, suggests that despite its size, Caerwent never achieved the cultural level of other Romano-British tribal capitals.

In 2010 a programme of archaeological work was carried out, by Monmouth Archaeology, as part of the construction of a new garage, at Museum Cottage. A number of finds were made.

References

External links

Aerial video showing many parts of Roman Caerwent
Museum Wales info on the Forum Basilica at Caerwent
Artifacts and information relating to Venta Silurum held on Gathering the Jewels
Venta Silurum on the Roman Britain website
Channel 4 Time Team website - Caerwent excavation

Archaeological sites in Monmouthshire
Cadw
History of Monmouthshire
Roman towns in Wales
Ruins in Wales
Buildings and structures in Monmouthshire
75 establishments
Former populated places in Wales
Tourist attractions in Monmouthshire
Museums of ancient Rome in Wales
Archaeological museums in Wales
70s establishments in the Roman Empire
1st-century establishments in Roman Britain
Scheduled monuments in Monmouthshire